Vernersbridge railway station was a railway station in County Armagh, Northern Ireland.

History

The Portadown, Dungannon and Omagh Junction Railway (PD&O) opened the station in 1858 as Verner's, named after local landowner William Verner. The station had no signal box and its signals were worked by a ground frame.

The newly formed Great Northern Railway (GNR) absorbed the PD&O in 1876 and doubled the track through Vernersbridge in 1899–1902.

The GNR was nationalised in 1953 as the GNR Board, which closed Vernersbridge station in 1954.  The Ulster Transport Authority took over the GNR's remaining lines in Northern Ireland in 1958 and closed the PD&O line on 15 February 1965.

The former station and goods shed survive: the station as a private house and the goods shed as its outbuilding.

References

Sources

Disused railway stations in County Armagh
Railway stations opened in 1858
Railway stations closed in 1965
Great Northern Railway (Ireland)
1858 establishments in Ireland
1965 disestablishments in Northern Ireland
Railway stations in Northern Ireland opened in the 19th century